is a Japanese software publishing company specializing in the publishing and distribution of adult visual novels for 23 game development brands that Nexton is partners with. The company is located in Osaka, Japan. The current president, Akihiko Suzuki has served as the chief director of the Ethics Organization of Computer Software.

Brands
Azarashi Soft and its subsidiaries, Azarashi Soft+1 and Azarashi Soft Zero
BaseSon and its subsidiaries, BaseSon SPICE* and BaseSon Light
Cinematograph
Galactica
Herencia
KarinProject
Latte (Formerly Tactics*Latte)
Liquid
Lusterise
Luxury (Formerly Tactics*Luxury) and its subsidiary Luxury Tiara
M's TOY BOX:
Dark One!
GLASSES
RE:creation 
Sky Rocket
Mayfar Soft
Nameless
Nomad
Portion
Pure-Liquid
Score and its subsidiary Score [Shukoa!]
Torte Soft
Yumemiru (Co-owned by DiGination)

Former brands
PL+US
Psycho—produced Miko Miko Nurse
Tactics
RaSen (succeeded by Yukari, independent from Nexton)

Tactics
Tactics was a brand of Nexton from 1997 to 2011. Their debut release was a game titled Dōsei in mid-1997, followed by Moon in the same year, and One: Kagayaku Kisetsu e in 1998. The last two games were met with much praise from the Japanese community. While the studio was still in its early years, the core team of both Moon and One broke off and began their own company, Key, in 1998. Tactics continued to release games despite this sudden change in staff. In 2009, Tactics became two separate brands: Tactics Luxury and Tactics*Latte. In 2011, the Tactics brand shut down and the two brands became independent.

Games produced by Tactics
Dōsei (1997)
Moon (1997)
Moon Renewal (1998)
One: Kagayaku Kisetsu e (1998)
Games produced as a part of Nexton
Suzu ga Utau Hi (1999)
Yūyake -November- (2000)
Variety Tactics (2000)
Sui Sui Sweet (2000)
Cheerio! (2001)
Kemono Gakuen (2001)
Flügel ~Yakusoku no Aozora no Shita e~ (2002)
Unicchi! ~Weenie Witches~ (2002)
Apocalypse ~Deus Ex Machina~ (2003)
Zaishuu -The SiN- (2004)
Tenshi no Himegoto (2005)
Harem Party (2006)
Games produced by Tactics Luxury
As Tactics Luxury
Trouble@Vampire! ~Ano Ko wa Ore no Goshujinsama~ (2009)
As Luxury
Maou no Kuse ni Namaiki da! (2012)
Akuma de Oshioki! Marukido Sadoshiki Hentai Oshioki Kouza (2013)
Maou no Kuse ni Namaiki da! 2 ~Kondo wa Seisen da!~ (2013)
Games produced by Tactics*Latte
As Tactics*Latte
Dakkoshite Gyu! ~Ore no Yome wa Dakimakura~ (2009)
As Latte
Imouto Senbatsu☆Sousenkyo (2011)
Dainikai Imouto Senbatsu☆Sousenkyo ~366ninme no Imouto Icha Love Nijitsudan~ (2012)
Koiseyo!! Imouto Banchou (2013)

References

External links
 

Amusement companies of Japan
Video game publishers
Video game companies of Japan
Video game companies established in 1993
Japanese companies established in 1993